Desiya Geetham ( National Anthem) is a 1998 Indian Tamil-language drama film directed by Cheran. The film co-produced by R. Chandru, Abuthahir, Sathish Kumar, G. V. Suresh Kumar. The film created controversy during release and received positive reviews. The film was one among 1998 Deepavali releases.

Plot
The film is about a Chief minister and his family being kidnapped and taken to a remote village making them undergo the hardships of village life to learn about it. Murali played the role of a villager who was looking for revolutionary means to correct the political system in Tamil Nadu. The basic line of the story was that the leaders should understand and know the difficulties faced by his subjects.

Cast

Soundtrack
The music was composed by Ilaiyaraaja and lyrics were written by Arivumathi, Pazhani Bharathi, Vaasan, and received positive reviews.

Reception
A critic from Dinakaran noted "Cheran has won in highlighting minutely and emotively the village maladies and it's disastrous shortcomings". A reviewer from Deccan Herald noted "This film has a message, which is meant for all of us, “Before the last Indian goes mad, let’s do something".

References

External links
Desiya geethem at thenisai
 

1998 films
Films directed by Cheran
Films scored by Ilaiyaraaja
1990s Tamil-language films
Films shot in Delhi
Indian political drama films
1990s political drama films
1998 drama films